Fügen is a municipality in the Schwaz district in the Austrian state of Tyrol.

References

Cities and towns in Schwaz District